Zavlaka is a village in Serbia. It is situated in the Krupanj municipality, in the Mačva District of Central Serbia. The village had a Serb ethnic majority and a population of 962 in 2002.

Historical population

1948: 1,487
1953: 1,547
1961: 1,410
1971: 1,176
1981: 1,039
1991: 991
2002: 962

References

See also
List of places in Serbia

Populated places in Mačva District